Ricardo Oscar Phillips (born 31 January 1975) is a Panamanian former football midfielder.

Club career
A short-sized but speedy attacking midfielder, Phillips started his career at Euro Kickers and joined Panamá Viejo in 2001. He later signed for Tauro, who loaned him to Major League Soccer franchise New England Revolution in summer 2005. In January 2006, Phillips was announced as a reinforcement by Colombian club Atlético Bucaramanga and he joined Deportivo Pereira for a trial in summer 2007, but a definitive move did not materialize. He did play in Panama for the Liga Panameña de Fútbol team San Francisco FC.

In April 2013, Phillips was keen on winning promotion with second division side Millenium UP.

International career
Nicknamed Patón, he made his debut for the Panama national football team in a June 1996 FIFA World Cup qualification match against Belize and has earned a total of 84 caps, scoring 11 goals. He represented his country in 21 FIFA World Cup qualification matches and was a member of the 2005 CONCACAF Gold Cup team, who finished second in the tournament and he also played at the 2007 and 2009 CONCACAF Gold Cups as well as at the 2009 UNCAF Nations Cup, where Panama were champions.

His final international was a January 2010 friendly match against Chile.

Personal life
Phillips' son Ricardo is also a professional footballer, currently signed with Slovak Fortuna Liga club DAC 1904 Dunajská Streda.

International goals
Scores and results list Panama's goal tally first.

References

External links

1975 births
Living people
Sportspeople from Panama City
Association football midfielders
Panamanian footballers
Panama international footballers
2005 UNCAF Nations Cup players
2005 CONCACAF Gold Cup players
2007 UNCAF Nations Cup players
2007 CONCACAF Gold Cup players
2009 UNCAF Nations Cup players
2009 CONCACAF Gold Cup players
Copa Centroamericana-winning players
Panamá Viejo players
Tauro F.C. players
New England Revolution players
San Francisco F.C. players
Unión Deportivo Universitario players
Sporting San Miguelito players
Atlético Veragüense players
Panamanian expatriate footballers
Expatriate soccer players in the United States
Major League Soccer players
Liga Panameña de Fútbol players